Sarab Bagh Rural District is a rural district (dehestan) in Sarab Bagh District, Abdanan County, Ilam Province, Iran. At the 2006 census, its population (including Sarab Bagh, which has since been promoted to city status and removed from the rural district) was 4,678
in 922 families; excluding Sarab Bagh, the population (as of 2006) was 2,405
in 464 families.  The rural district has 8 villages.

References 

Rural Districts of Ilam Province
Abdanan County